There are two James W. Townsend Houses, both in Florida:

James W. Townsend House (Lake Butler, Florida), listed on the NRHP in Florida
James W. Townsend House (Orange Springs, Florida), listed on the NRHP in Florida